Bullivant is a surname. Notable people with the surname include:

Benjamin Bullivant, Attorney General of the Dominion of New England (1686–1687)
Dargan Bullivant (born 1925, architect
Brian Bullivant (born 1927), British sprint canoeist
Patricia Bullivant (born 1930), landscape architect
Chris Bullivant, British newspaper publisher
Mike Bullivant, British chemist
Terry Bullivant (born 1956), English footballer and manager
Lucy Bullivant, author and curatorial director

Fictional characters
Sir Walter Bullivant, character in novels by John Buchan